Melissa Stribling (7 November 1926 – 22 March 1992) was a Scottish film and television actress, who began her acting career as part of a professional group who presented a different stage play each week at the Croydon 'Grand' theatre. She is best known for playing the role of Mina Holmwood in the horror film Dracula (1958).

Career
Born in Gourock, Scotland as Melissa Stribling Smith, her career began with a small role in the film The First Gentleman (1948). Stribling is known for playing the role of Mina Holmwood in the horror film Dracula (1958) starring Christopher Lee in the title role. In the 1960s and 1970s, she guest-starred in the TV series Benny Hill (1963), ITV Play of the Week, The Avengers, The Persuaders!, The Dick Emery Show, and The New Avengers. Her last appearance was in the film Paris by Night (1988) with Charlotte Rampling.

In the film Dracula, her character was the victim of a vampire in what can be seen as an erotically charged performance. Dracula and Mina showing sexual pleasure in this way was a first in British cinema.

Terence Fisher remembers her asking him how to play the scene. Terence replied, saying that she should imagine that she had one whale of a sexual night and that it should be shown on her face. The author Mark Clark detailed the first encounter between Dracula and Mina in his book Smirk, sneer, and scream: great acting in horror cinema which he described as an implied erotic scene. Jonathan Rigby complimented her performance in his book English gothic: a century of horror cinema, saying that she is a terrific female lead throughout the film. Terence Fisher said that he told her that she produced a satisfied little facial expression that speaks volumes.

Family
She was married to Basil Dearden; their son is James Dearden, also a film director. Their younger son is Torquil Dearden, a London-based editor at a company specialising in commercials and corporate videos.

Filmography

References

External links

1926 births
1992 deaths
Scottish film actresses
Scottish television actresses
People from Gourock
20th-century Scottish actresses